Gaia Symphony is a documentary film series directed by Jin Tatsumura. The series revolves around the Gaia hypothesis. The series has nine episodes. Each episode examines a small number of extraordinary people who somehow relate to the central theme. Some of the people examined are notable, including Reinhold Messner (episode 1) and Jane Goodall (episode 4). Created originally in the Japanese language, there are English versions available.

Episodes 

The first episode was released in 1992:
Episode 1 (1992)
Shigeo Nozawa
Reinhold Messner
Daphne Sheldrick
Russell Schweickart
Episode 2 (1995)
Jacques Mayol
The 14th Dalai Lama
Prof. Frank Drake
Hatsume Sato
Episode 3 (1997)
Michio Hoshino
George Dyson
Freeman Dyson
Nainoa Thompson
Episode 4 (2001) For the Children Who Will Be Born and Grow in the 21st Century
James Lovelock
Gerry Lopez
Jane Goodall
Bokunen Naka
Episode 5 (2004) Everything is Connected
Ervin Laszlo
Akiko Ishigaki
Episode 6 (2007) Every Existence Resonates Together
Ravi Shankar
Kelly Yost
Roger Payne
Episode 7 (2010)
Andrew Weil
Takako Takano
Greg LeMond

References

External links
 
 

Japanese documentary television series